Dirty realism is a term coined by Bill Buford of Granta magazine to define a North American literary movement. Writers in this sub-category of realism are said to depict the seamier or more mundane aspects of ordinary life in spare, unadorned language.

Definition
The term formed the title of the Summer 1984 edition of Granta, for which Buford wrote an explanatory introduction:

Dirty Realism is the fiction of a new generation of American authors. They write about the belly-side of contemporary life – a deserted husband, an unwanted mother, a car thief, a pickpocket, a drug addict – but they write about it with a disturbing detachment, at times verging on comedy. Understated, ironic, sometimes savage, but insistently compassionate, these stories constitute a new voice in fiction.

Style
Sometimes considered a variety of literary minimalism, dirty realism is characterized by an economy with words and a focus on surface description. Writers working within the genre tend to avoid adverbs, extended metaphor and internal monologue, instead allowing objects and context to dictate meaning. Characters are shown in ordinary, unremarkable occupations, and often a lack of resources and money that creates an internal desperation.

Notable authors
After Buford's categorisation, the definition has expanded to include, according to Michael Hemmingson, the movement's "godfather" Charles Bukowski (1920–1994), as well as those who appeared in Granta 8, including Raymond Carver (1938–1988), Tobias Wolff (b. 1945), Richard Ford (b. 1944), Larry Brown (1951–2004), Frederick Barthelme (b. 1943), Cormac McCarthy (b. 1933), Pedro Juan Gutiérrez (b. 1950), Fernando Velázquez Medina (b. 1951), Chuck Palahniuk (b. 1962), Carson McCullers (1917–1967), and Jayne Anne Phillips (b. 1952). These authors have rarely accepted or self-applied this term, despite close associations and affinities.

If Bukowski is considered the movement's "godfather", John Fante's influence on the movement cannot be overstated. Bukowski's own style was heavily influenced by the work of John Fante, and the former stated in his introduction to Fante's Ask the Dust that, "Fante was my god". Bukowski dedicated poems to Fante, and in the early part of his career was said to go around shouting, "I am Arturo Bandini!" in reference to Fante's alter ego. In his 1978 novel Women, Bukowski's alter ego Henry Chinaski is asked to name his favorite author and he replies, "Fante."

See also
Kmart realism
Grunge lit
Postmodernist literature

References

External links
Facebook group dedicated to Dirty Realism

American literary movements
Literary realism
20th-century American literature
1980s neologisms
Charles Bukowski